The Grammy Award for Best Recording Package is one of a series of Grammy Awards presented for the visual look of an album. It is presented to the art director of the winning album, not to the performer(s), unless the performer is also the art director.

The Grammy Award for Best Album Cover dates back to the first Grammy Awards in 1959. From 1962 to 1965 it was separated into Classical and Non-Classical divisions. From 1966 to 1968 it was separated into Graphic Arts and Photography divisions. In 1974, the name of the award was changed to Best Album Package, and changed again in 1994 to the current name.

In 1995, boxed sets were no longer eligible, as they were split off into a separate award, currently known as the Grammy Award for Best Boxed or Special Limited Edition Package.

Winners and nominees

Multiple wins
The following individuals received two or more awards for Best Recording Package (or any previous iteration of the award):

References

Recording Package
Packaging
Cover art awards